The Women's keirin at the 2011 UCI Track Cycling World Championships was held on March 27. 23 athletes participated in the contest. After the 4 qualifying heats, the 2 fastest rider in each heat advanced to the second round. The riders that did not advance to the second round raced in 4 repechage heats. The first rider in each heat advanced to the second round along with the 8 that qualified before.

The first 3 riders from each of the 2 Second Round heats advanced to the Final and the remaining riders raced a consolation 7–12 final.

Results

First round
The First Round was held at 10:30.

First Round Repechage
The First Round Repechage was held at 12:10.

Second round
The Second Round was held at 10:30.

Final 7-12 places

Final
The finals were held at 17:05.

References

2011 UCI Track Cycling World Championships
UCI Track Cycling World Championships – Women's keirin